(born January 20, 1951) is a Ryukyuan politician and former mayor of Naha, the capital city of Okinawa Prefecture.

References 

1951 births
Living people
Women mayors of places in Japan
People from Naha